Alfredo J. Zibechi (30 October 1894 – 19 June 1958) was a Uruguayan footballer who played for the Uruguay national team between 1915 and 1924. Zibechi was part of 6 Copa América squads, and was involved in three triumphs in the competition (1916, 1920 & 1924). He was also a member of the Uruguayan squad which won the gold medal in the 1924 Olympics. Zibechi started playing club football for Montevideo Wanderers and in 1919 or 1920 moved to Nacional.

References

External links
profile

1894 births
1958 deaths
Uruguayan people of Italian descent
Uruguayan footballers
Footballers at the 1924 Summer Olympics
Olympic footballers of Uruguay
Olympic gold medalists for Uruguay
Uruguay international footballers
Uruguayan Primera División players
Montevideo Wanderers F.C. players
Club Nacional de Football players
Olympic medalists in football
Medalists at the 1924 Summer Olympics
Copa América-winning players
Association football midfielders